Peter Higgins (born 11 October 1966) is a former Australian rules footballer who played with the West Coast Eagles in the Victorian Football League (VFL).

Higgins played at both under-19s and reserves level with the Carlton Football Club but didn't make an appearance in the seniors. A ruckman, he joined Claremont in 1987 in search of greater opportunities and participated in their WAFL premiership team that year.

He was picked up by West Coast with the 10th pick of the 1988 VFL draft and had 28 hit-outs on debut, against Collingwood. After just one season and four games, Higgins was de-listed by the club.

References

External links
 
 

1966 births
West Coast Eagles players
Claremont Football Club players
Living people
Australian rules footballers from Victoria (Australia)